Dorit Petschel, married name Körner (born 1970), is a German historian and teacher.

Life 
Die sächsische Außenpolitik unter Kurfürst Friedrich August III. 1785 bis 1806. In 1997–1999, she held a traineeship at the Gymnasium Kreuzschule in Dresden, which was followed by the Second Staatsexamen in 1999. In 1999/2000 she taught at the Sauerbruch-Gymnasium Großröhrsdorf.

Petschel then headed the Geschichte der Technischen Universität Dresden office until 2003. In this catalogue of professors, all of the approximately 2,000 professors who have worked at today's Technical University or its predecessor institutions since its foundation in 1828 until the anniversary year 2003 are listed in alphabetical order. A position as a consultant for university development (2003–2005) was followed by work as a research assistant at the Institute for History at the Technical University of Dresden.

She now teaches German and history at the 36 Oberschule Dresden.

Publications 
  (1826–1890). In Sächsische Justizminister 1831 bis 1850. Acht biographische Skizzen (Sächsische Justizgeschichte volume 4). Sächsisches Staatsministerium der Justiz – Referat Presse- und Öffentlichkeitsarbeit, Dresden 1994,  (Numerized).
 Die Persönlichkeit Friedrich Augusts des Gerechten, Kurfürsten und Königs von Sachsen. In Uwe Schirmer (ed.): Sachsen 1763 bis 1832. Zwischen Rétablissement und bürgerlichen Reformen. Sax-Verlag, Beucha, 1996, .
 Sächsische Außenpolitik unter Friedrich August I. Zwischen Rétablissement, Rheinbund und Restauration (Dresdner historische Studien Band 4). Böhlau, Cologne among others. 2000, .
 175 Jahre TU Dresden. Volume 3: Die Professoren der TU Dresden 1828–2003. Böhlau, Cologne among others 2003, .

References

External links 
 
 Entries on Dorit Petschel in OCLC WorldCat

German women historians
1970 births
Living people
Place of birth missing (living people)